The  was an aircraft and airbase garrison unit of the Imperial Japanese Navy (IJN) during the Pacific campaign of World War II.

First generation

History
The Misawa Air Group was established on 10 February 1942 in Misawa, Japan and operated Mitsubishi G4M medium bombers. After the Allied landing on Guadalcanal and Tulagi on 7 August, the unit was dispatched to Rabaul on New Britain and was assigned to 26th Air Flotilla. First, Lieutenant Hiromi Ikeda (group's Buntaichō) brought nine G4M medium bombers in late afternoon on 7 August. The next day, the remaining 18 G4M medium bombers were brought by Lieutenant Tomoo Nakamura (group's Hikōtaichō). With them came also Vice Admiral Nishizō Tsukahara, the commander of the 11th Air Fleet. The unit first saw action on 8 August, when Lieutenant Ikeda's nine medium bombers joined 17 from 4th Air Group led by Lieutenant Shigeru Kotani, in order to make a torpedo attack on Allied shipping around Guadalcanal and Tulagi. The attack was a disaster since only five bombers made it back to Rabaul, while the rest were shot down by a combination of intense AA fire from Rear Admiral Richmond K. Turner's ships and intercepting Grumman F4F Wildcat fighters from Rear Admiral Frank J. Fletcher's carriers. Among those killed in action were also the leaders Kotani and Ikeda. In return, they only managed to put one torpedo in the destroyer Jarvis, in addition to damaging one transport when one damaged bomber rammed it. The following day, 9 August, Lieutenant Nakamura led 17 torpedo-armed bombers from Misawa Air Group to search for the enemy carriers. He could not locate the carriers and settled on attacking and sinking the damaged Jarvis that was leaving the area.

The air group conducted frequent missions against Guadalcanal throughout August. On occasions, the focus was shifted to New Guinea. For example, on 17 August, Lieutenant Nakamura led 25 bombers to attack Port Moresby. The attack was relatively successful since they managed to destroy several aircraft on the ground. On 26 August, Lieutenant Nakamura led 17 bombers from Misawa and Kisarazu Air Group to attack recently finished Henderson Field on Guadalcanal. They managed to destroy 2,000 gallons of aviation fuel and damage several aircraft on the ground. Almost daily raids against Guadalcanal were carried out by the bombers of Misawa Air Group in the first half of September, where Lieutenants Nakamura, Rinji Morita and Yūsaburō Nonaka exchanged in leading the unit's formations within the larger strikes composed of Misawa, Kisarazu and Chitose Air Group. The second half of September brought frequent bad weather and attacks against Guadalcanal were temporarily suspended and the attention was again shifted to New Guinea, when Misawa bombers participated in an attack on Port Moresby on 21 September.

The weather improved at the end of the month and operations against Guadalcanal resumed. On 28 September, Lieutenant Morita led a combined strike of 27 bombers from Misawa, Takao Air Group, Kanoya Air Group against Guadalcanal. Even though they were escorted by 14 Mitsubishi A6M Zero fighters from Tainan Air Group and additional 27 from 6th Air Group led by Lieutenant Mitsugi Kofukuda, most of the fighters failed to engage the intercepting 35 US Marine and Navy Wildcat fighters, which resulted in the loss of Morita command bomber and four more Takao bombers. After these significant losses of medium bombers, the command at Rabaul decided to temporarily change the tactics, where the bombers only served as a decoy and turned around before reaching Guadalcanal, while the fighters went ahead alone to surprise the defending enemy fighters. In accordance with this new tactic, nine Misawa bombers acted as a decoy on 2 October, while in the resulting air combat Lieutenant Kofukuda's Zero fighters shot down six Wildcat fighters and two Douglas SBD Dauntless dive bombers for the loss of only one Zero.

The strikes by medium bombers resumed on 11 October, when Misawa under Reserve Lieutenant (jg) Nobuyoshi Takamura contributed nine medium bombers to the largest single strike in the Guadalcanal campaign, which was composed of 45 bombers in total. Nevertheless, due to bad weather, the result was disappointing since most of the bombers could not find the target. From 11 to 14 October Rabaul was sending two bomber raids per day, where Misawa contributed bombers (either led by Nonaka or Takamura) to at least one of the raid per day. From 15 October onward, they shifted back to one raid against Guadalcanal per day and Misawa continued to contribute bombers to these raids throughout the rest of October.

On 1 November, Misawa Air Group was redesignated to 705th Air Group. On 11 November, newly promoted Lieutenant Commander Nakamura led 16 torpedo-armed bombers against the enemy ships around Guadalcanal. They were intercepted by 16 Wildcat and eight Bell P-39 Airacobra fighters and in combination with AA fire from the ships, they shot down 11 medium bombers, while the rest returned severely damaged. This put an end to further raids by medium bombers against Guadalcanal. On 29 January 1943, 705th Air Group was involved in the Battle of Rennell Island. Lieutenant Commander Nakamura led 16 torpedo-armed bombers against the enemy ships spotted near Rennell Island. They scored no hits and in return lost one bomber, however, subsequent attacks by other air groups managed to sink the cruiser Chicago. On 12 April, the unit participated in Operation I-Go, where Lieutenant Commander Nakamura led 27 bombers against Port Moresby. Two days later, they also participated in a raid against Milne Bay. The unit continued to be involved in the Solomon Islands campaign until 5 September, when it was withdrawn to Tinian.

Structure
Higher unit
Ōminato Guard District (10 February 1942–31 March 1942)
26th Air Flotilla (1 April 1942–31 August 1943
Renamed 705th Air Group on 1 November 1942.
25th Air Flotilla (1 September 1943–14 October 1943)
28th Air Flotilla (15 October 1943–1 October 1944, dissolved.)
All land-based attack bombers were independent to the 706th Attack Squadron on 4 March 1944.
Commanding officers
Commander/Captain Masao Sugawara (10 February 1942–9 December 1942)
Captain Yasuo Konishi (10 December 1942–23 May 1944)
Captain Tarōhachi Shinoda (24 May 1944–1 October 1944, dissolved.)

Second generation
Reborn as the preparatory flight training unit (Yokaren).

Structure
Higher unit
19th Combined Air Group (1 September 1944–1 March 1945)
Ōminato Guard District (1 March 1945–30 June 1945, dissolved.)
Commanding officers
Commander Takeo Higo (1 September 1944–29 September 1944)
Captain Shōgo Miyashita (29 September 1944–30 June 1945, dissolved.)

706th Attack Squadron

Structure
Higher unit
755th Air Group (4 March 1944–10 July 1944, dissolved.)
Squadron leader
Lieutenant commander Fumio Iwaya (4 March 1944–10 July 1944, dissolved.)

References

Notes

Citations

Soruces

Combat reports

Further reading
The Japanese Modern Historical Manuscripts Association, Organizations, structures and personnel affairs of the Imperial Japanese Army & Navy, University of Tokyo Press, Tōkyō, Japan, 1971, .
Seiki Sakamoto/Hideki Fukukawa, Encyclopedia of organizations of the Imperial Japanese Navy, K.K. Fuyo Shobo Shuppan, Tōkyō, Japan, 2003, .
Bunrin-Dō Co., Ltd., Tōkyō, Japan.
Famous airplanes of the world
No. 59, Type 1 Attack Bomber, 1996, .
No. 91, Type 96 Attack Bomber, 2001, .
Koku-Fan Illustrated No. 42, Japanese Imperial Army & Navy Aircraft Color, Markig, 1988.
Model Art, Model Art Co. Ltd., Tōkyō, Japan.
No. 406, Special issue Camouflage & Markings of Imperial Japanese Navy Bombers in W.W.II, 1993.
No. 553, Special issue I.J.N. Carrier Attack Bomber, 2000.
Alumni Association of the 705th Naval Air group, History of the 705th Naval Air Group, Sougo Insatsu Kougei K.K., Tōkyō, Japan, 1985.
Fumio Iwaya (flight officer of the Misawa/705th Naval Air Group, squadron leader of the 706th Attack Squadron.)Navy land-based attack bomber (First volume), Asahi Sonorama, Tōkyō, Japan, 1996, .Navy land-based attack bomber (Last volume), Asahi Sonorama, Tōkyō, Japan, 1996, .Senshi Sōsho, Asagumo Simbun, Tōkyō, Japan.
 Vol. 80, Combined Fleet #2, "Until June 1942", 1975.
 Vol. 77, Combined Fleet #3, "Until February 1943", 1974.
 Vol. 39, Combined Fleet #4, "First part of the Third step Operations", 1970.
 Vol. 71, Combined Fleet #5, "Middle part of the Third step Operations", 1974.
 Vol. 45, Combined Fleet #6, "Latter part of the Third step Operations", 1971.
 Vol. 93, Combined Fleet #7, "Final part of the War", 1976.
Japan Center for Asian Historical Records (http://www.jacar.go.jp/english/index.html), National Archives of Japan, Tōkyō, Japan.
Reference code: C08030508200, Wartime log book from September 1, 1944 to May 31, 1945, Ominato Naval Guard Station Office (5), Ōminato Guard District, 1945.
Reference code: C08051771200, Transition table of formation of Imperial Japan Navy Air Units (special establishment) during Pacific War'', Japan Demobilization Agency, 1949.

Groups of the Imperial Japanese Navy Air Service
Military units and formations established in 1942
Military units and formations established in 1944